The 2016 Belgian Cup Final, named Croky Cup after the sponsor, was the 61st Belgian Cup final and took place on 20 March 2016 between Club Brugge and Standard Liège. It was the first time the two teams met in the final since the 2006–07 Belgian Cup Final. Standard Liège won the match by 2 goals to 1, with the final goal coming two minutes from time.

Route to the final

Match

Details

External links

Footnotes

Belgian Cup finals
Cup Final
Club Brugge KV matches
Standard Liège matches
March 2016 sports events in Europe
2016 in Brussels
Sports competitions in Brussels